Frigyes Korányi may refer to:
 Frigyes Korányi (physician) (1828–1913), Hungarian physician
 Frigyes Korányi (politician) (1869–1935), his son, Hungarian politician